Bullfrog is a ghost town in Nye County, in the U.S. state of Nevada.

Bullfrog is near the Goldwell Open Air Museum and its Red Barn Art Center. The Bullfrog jail, the barn, the museum's information center and its outdoor sculptures are located along a spur road leading from State Route 374 to Rhyolite.

History

Bullfrog Mine was discovered by Frank "Shorty" Harris and Eddie Cross on August 9, 1904.  The name Bullfrog was chosen either because Eddie Cross was fond of singing 'O, the bulldog on the bank and the bullfrog in the pool...' or because the ore sample of rich gold was found in green-stained rock and was frog-shaped.

It is probable Original was added to the name of the mine to distinguish it from the mining camp.  By the winter of 1904, Bullfrog had about a thousand people living in tents, dugouts and congested traffic made a demand for rail connections  The Bullfrog-Goldfield Railroad reached Rhyolite on May 22, 1907.

See also
Bullfrog County, Nevada

References

External links
 

Ghost towns in Nye County, Nevada
Amargosa Desert
Historic districts in Nevada
Mining communities in Nevada
Ghost towns in Nevada